Daniel Q. Kennis (1917, New York City – May 19, 2006, Palo Alto, California) was an American B-movie producer.

Filmography
Angels' Wild Women (1972)
I Spit on Your Corpse (1974)
Naughty Stewardesses (1975)
Cinderella 2000 (1977)
Team-Mates (1978)
Raiders of the Living Dead (1986)
Alienator (1989)

He was also the production manager for Dracula vs. Frankenstein (1971).

External links

1917 births
2006 deaths
American film producers